Imtiaz Ali (born 16 June 1971) is an Indian film director, producer, actor and writer who works in Hindi cinema.

Early and personal life 
Imtiaz Ali was born in Jamshedpur and spent some of his early years in Patna. Imtiaz belongs to the Muslim family of Jamshedpur in Bihar (now Jharkhand).
His father Mansoor Ali was a contractor who did irrigation job, and as a child he would sometimes accompany him, which gave Imtiaz a sense of what was going on in the innards of India. His uncle, through his mother, is Pakistani TV actor and director/producer Khalid Ahmed. He had his early education in  St. Michael's High School,Patna and later in D.B.M.S. English School, Jamshedpur, He is the brother of director Arif Ali (who made his directional debut with the film Lekar Hum Deewana Dil).

In an interview with The Times of India he talks about his early influence of cinema:

He attended Hindu College, University of Delhi, where he took part in college theater. He was very successful in college. He also started Ibtida, the dramatics society of the college. Thereafter he moved to Mumbai and did a diploma course from Xavier Institute of Communication.

Imtiaz is married to Preety Ali. They have a daughter named Ida Ali, who is also a director.

Career
Imtiaz began his career directing TV programs including Kurukshetra for Zee TV and Imtihaan for Doordarshan. He moved on to Bollywood films. In 2005, he made his directorial debut with Socha Na Tha starring Abhay Deol and Ayesha Takia. He quoted, later in a talk, that it took him three years to make the film.

His second film, Jab We Met, starred then real-life couple Kareena Kapoor and Shahid Kapoor, and became a box office success. His next film, Love Aaj Kal starred Saif Ali Khan and Deepika Padukone, and emerged as his biggest commercial success to date. Ali's next film Rockstar, starring Ranbir Kapoor, did well at the box office despite mixed reviews with praise for Kapoor's performance and A.R. Rahman's music which has now achieved cult status.

Ali founded his film production company, Window Seat Films; whose first release was Highway. Starring Randeep Hooda and Alia Bhatt, the film was well appreciated by critics and is credited as one of his best films. His next production film, Tamasha, starred Ranbir Kapoor and Deepika Padukone in the lead roles and was released to mixed reviews on 27 November 2015, although it has went on to achieve cult status for its subject inspiring many youngsters later on and has been recognised as one of Ali's best films. The movie was a moderate success and opened to good reviews from cities.

His next directorial venture Jab Harry Met Sejal, starring Shah Rukh Khan and Anushka Sharma in lead roles, was released in August 2017. The film released to negative reviews in India, even though it did well overseas. His next release after 3 years, Love Aaj Kal, starring Kartik Aaryan and Sara Ali Khan, released on 14 February 2020, and opened to negative reviews.

Filmography

Frequent collaborations

Awards and nominations 
List of awards and nominations received by Imtiaz Ali.

Filmfare Awards 
The Filmfare Awards are presented annually by The Times Group to honour both artistic and technical excellence of professionals in the Hindi cinema.

International Indian Film Academy Awards 
The International Indian Film Academy Awards (shortened as IIFA) is an annual international event organised by the Wizcraft International Entertainment Pvt. Ltd. to honour excellence in the Hindi cinema.

Producers Guild Film Awards 
The Producers Guild Film Awards (previously known as the Apsara Film & Television Producers Guild Awards) is an annual event organised by the Film Producers Guild of India.

Screen Awards 
The Screen Awards are presented annually by Indian Express Limited to honour excellence in Hindi cinema.

Other awards

References

External links 
 
 A very short Interview with Imtiaz Ali at Indian Auteur

1971 births
Living people
Writers from Patna
People from Jamshedpur
Hindu College, Delhi alumni
21st-century Indian film directors
Indian male screenwriters
Hindi-language film directors
Filmfare Awards winners
Screenwriters from Bihar
Film directors from Bihar
Zee Cine Awards winners